Chaker Meftah ((born 29 September 1957) is a Tunisian professional football manager and former player and the current head coach of US Ben Guerdane.

References

1957 births
Living people
Tunisian football managers
Olympique Béja managers
US Ben Guerdane managers
Tunisian Ligue Professionnelle 1 managers